Sassia is a genus of sea snails, marine gastropod molluscs in the family Cymatiidae.

Species
The genus Sassia contains the following species:

 † Sassia antiqua (Deshayes, 1865)
 † Sassia apenninica (Sassi, 1827) 
 † Sassia bernayi (Cossmann, 1889) 
 † Sassia bicincta (Deshayes, 1835) 
 † Sassia carinulata (Cossmann, 1889) 
 † Sassia colubrina (Lamarck, 1803) 
 † Sassia cuneata (Cossmann, 1885) 
 † Sassia cyphoides (Finlay, 1924) 
 † Sassia decagonia (Finlay, 1924) 
 † Sassia delafossei (Rouault, 1850) 
 † Sassia dumortieri (Baudon, 1853) 
 † Sassia faxense (Ravn, 1933) 
 † Sassia formosa (Deshayes, 1865) 
 † Sassia foveolata (Sandberger, 1860) 
 † Sassia lejeunii (Melleville, 1843) 
 † Sassia maoria (Finlay, 1924) 
 Sassia melpangi Harasewych & Beu, 2007
 Sassia midwayensis (Habe & Okutani, 1968)
 Sassia minima (Hutton, 1873) 
 Sassia mozambicana R. Aiken & Seccombe, 2019
 † Sassia multigranifera (Deshayes, 1835) 
 Sassia nassariformis (G. B. Sowerby III, 1902)
 † Sassia neozelanica (P. Marshall & R. Murdoch, 1923) 
 † Sassia nodularia (Lamarck, 1803) 
 † Sassia pahaoaensis (Vella, 1954) 
 † Sassia pusulosa (Marwick, 1965) 
 † Sassia raulini (Cossmann & Peyrot, 1924) 
 Sassia remensa (Iredale, 1936)
 † Sassia reticulosa (Deshayes, 1835) 
 † Sassia scabriuscula (Deshayes, 1865) 
 Sassia semitorta (Kuroda & Habe, 1961)
 † Sassia striatula (Lamarck, 1803) 
 † Sassia tortirostris (Tate, 1888) 
 † Sassia tuberculifera (Bronn, 1831) 
 Sassia zealta (Laws, 1939) 

Species brought into synonymy
 † Sassia arthritica (Powell & Bartrum, 1929): synonym of † Proxicharonia arthritica (Powell & Bartrum, 1929) 
 Sassia bassi - synonym: Austrotriton bassi (Angas, 1869)
 Sassia epitrema - synonym: Austrotriton epitrema (Tenison Woods, 1877)
 Sassia garrardi (Beu, 1970): synonym of Austrotriton garrardi Beu, 1970
 Sassia jobbernsi (L. C. King, 1933) †: synonym of Sassia kampyla (R. B. Watson, 1883): synonym of Cymatona kampyla (R. B. Watson, 1883)
 Sassia kampyla (R. B. Watson, 1883)  - synonym: Cymatona kampyla (Watson, 1883)
 Sassia lewisi Harasewych & Petuch, 1980 - synonym: Personella lewisi (Harasewych & Petuch, 1980)
 Sassia lindneri Parth, 1992: synonym of Austrosassia parkinsonia (Perry, 1811) 
  Sassia marshalli Beu, 1978: synonym of Sassia remensa (Iredale, 1936)
 Sassia mimetica  (Tate, 1893) - synonym: Austrotriton mimetica (Tate, 1893)
 Sassia palmeri  (Powell, 1967)- synonym: Proxicharonia palmeri (Powell, 1967)
 Sassia parkinsonia (Perry, 1811) - synonym: Austrosassia parkinsonia (Perry, 1811)
 Sassia petulans (Hedley & May, 1908): synonym of Austrotriton petulans (Hedley & May, 1908)
 Sassia philomelae (R. B. Watson, 1881): synonym of Cymatona philomelae (R. B. Watson, 1881)
 Sassia planocincta Wrigley, 1932 †: synonym of Pseudosassia planocincta (Wrigley, 1932) †
 Sassia ponderi Beu, 1987: synonym of Austrosassia ponderi (Beu, 1987)
 Sassia subdistorta (Lamarck, 1822) synonym: Austrotriton subdistortus (Lamarck, 1822)
 Sassia turrita (Eichwald, 1830) †: synonym of Pseudosassia turrita (Eichwald, 1830) †

References

 Cossmann M. (1889). Catalogue illustré des coquilles fossiles de l'Éocène des environs de Paris. Annales de la Société Royale Malacologique de Belgique. 24: 3-381, pl. 1-12

Further reading 
 Powell A. W. B., New Zealand Mollusca, William Collins Publishers Ltd, Auckland, New Zealand 1979

External links
 Bellardi, L. (1873). I molluschi dei terreni terziarii del Piemonte e della Liguria. Parte I. Cephalopoda, Pteropoda, Heteropoda. Gasteropoda (Muricidae et Tritonidae). Stamperia Reale, Torino, 264 pp., 15 pl.
 Iredale, T. (1936). Australian molluscan notes, no. 2. Records of the Australian Museum. 19(5): 267-340, pls 20-24
 Cossmann M. (1889). Catalogue illustré des coquilles fossiles de l'Éocène des environs de Paris. Annales de la Société Royale Malacologique de Belgique. 24: 3-381, pl. 1-12
 Beu A.G. (1998). Résultats des Campagnes MUSORSTOM: 19. Indo-West Pacific Ranellidae, Bursidae and Personidae (Mollusca: Gastropoda), a monograph of the New Caledonian fauna and revisions of related taxa. Mémoires du Muséum National d'Histoire Naturelle. 178: 1-255

Cymatiidae